The 1911–12 season was Galatasaray SK's 8th in existence.
Galatasaray protested the Unions Club's decision regarding Adnan İbrahim Pirioglu's penalty and did not participate in the Istanbul Football League. Sabri Mahir was the first Turkish footballer transferred to a European team, Olympic Paris, France in 1911.

Squad statistics

Friendly Matches
Kick-off listed in local time (EEST)

External links
 Galatasaray Sports Club Official Website 
 Turkish Football Federation - Galatasaray A.Ş. 
 uefa.com - Galatasaray AŞ

References
 Tekil, Süleyman. Dünden bugüne Galatasaray, (1983), page(156). Arset Matbaacılık Kol.Şti.
 Erdoğan Arıpınar; Tevfik Ünsi Artun, Cem Atabeyoğlu, Nurhan Aydın, Ergun Hiçyılmaz, Haluk San, Orhan Vedat Sevinçli, Vala Somalı (June 1992). Türk Futbol Tarihi (1904-1991) vol.1, Page(32), Türkiye Futbol Federasyonu Yayınları.
 Atabeyoğlu, Cem. 1453-1991 Türk Spor Tarihi Ansiklopedisi. page(61-62).(1991) An Grafik Basın Sanayi ve Ticaret AŞ
 Futbol vol.2, Galatasaray. Tercüman Spor Ansiklopedisi.(1981) (page 601)

Galatasaray S.K. (football) seasons
Turkish football clubs 1911–12 season
1910s in Istanbul